Moriah van Norman (born May 30, 1984) is an American water polo player who has played for the University of Southern California and the National team, who won the Peter J. Cutino Award in 2004, recognized as the best female collegiate player in the nation. Her position is two-meter offense (center forward).

High school and USC
van Norman was born in San Diego, California. She earned four-time high school All-American honors at University of San Diego High School in San Diego. She was named California Interscholastic Federation player of the year and league most valuable player in her senior season.

van Norman earned All-America honors in her 2003 freshman season after leading her USC Trojans team in scoring with 65 goals. She scored three or more goals in five matches including five against UC Berkeley and three against UCLA. As a 2004 sophomore, van Norman finished second on the team in scoring with 58 goals, leading her team to win the NCAA Women's Water Polo Championship. She became the third player in USC women's water polo history to win the Peter J. Cutino Award as the nation's top collegiate women's player and the last person to receive the award from legendary former Cal coach Pete Cutino, who died in September 2004. In 2005, van Norman was third on the team in scoring with 40 goals in her junior season. In her final season, USC, with a season record of 27-3, was top-seeded at the NCAA championships, but van Norman's six goals in the 3 tournament matches were not enough. She picked up her third ejection with 5:15 left in the final game, and sat out the remainder of the game on the bench as UCLA won, 9-8. van Norman racked up 215 goals in her four years with USC, third all-time in Trojan history.

Career
van Norman was a member of the U.S. Junior National Team, won gold at the 2005 FINA Junior World Championships and silver at the 2003 FINA Junior World Championships. She also played with the 2002 Pan-American Games championship team. van Norman is a member of the U.S. national team, which won silver at the 2005 FINA World Water Polo Championships.

At the 2008 China Summer Olympic games, she and the American team lost 8-9 in the Championship game to the Netherlands and took home the silver medal.

In June 2009, van Norman was named to the USA water polo women's senior national team for the 2009 FINA World Championships.

See also
 List of Olympic medalists in water polo (women)
 List of world champions in women's water polo
 List of World Aquatics Championships medalists in water polo

References

External links
 

1984 births
American female water polo players
Living people
Sportspeople from San Diego
American people of Dutch descent
Olympic silver medalists for the United States in water polo
Water polo players at the 2008 Summer Olympics
USC Trojans women's water polo players
Medalists at the 2008 Summer Olympics
World Aquatics Championships medalists in water polo
University of San Diego High School alumni